The 1888–89 season was the 16th season of competitive football in Scotland.

Honours

Cup honours

National

County

Glasgow Exhibition Cup 
The tournament was held to coincide with the International Exhibition of Science, Art and Industry. Held during the early season, the one-off competition was held at the Exhibition Grounds.

Scotland national team

Notes

References

External links 
Scottish Football Historical Archive
Scottish Junior Football Association

 
Seasons in Scottish football